Aebli is a surname. Notable people with the surname include:

Christian Aebli (born 1978), Swiss bobsledder
Hans Aebli (1921–1990), Swiss educationist, theorist, and researcher

See also
Aepli
Ebli (disambiguation)